Rush Lake Township is a township in Otter Tail County, Minnesota, United States. The population was 966 at the 2000 census.

Rush Lake Township was organized in 1871.

Geography
According to the United States Census Bureau, the township has a total area of 34.7 square miles (89.8 km), of which 26.8 square miles (69.4 km) is land and 7.9 square miles (20.5 km) (22.80%) is water.

Demographics
As of the census of 2000, there were 966 people, 379 households, and 294 families residing in the township. The racial makeup of the township was 98.65% White, 0.21% Native American, 0.10% Asian, 0.21% Pacific Islander, 0.21% from other races, and 0.62% from two or more races. Hispanic or Latino of any race were 0.41% of the population.

There were 379 households, out of which 31.4% had children under the age of 18 living with them, 71.0% were married couples living together, 2.6% had a female householder with no husband present, and 22.2% were non-families. 19.8% of all households were made up of individuals, and 9.2% had someone living alone who was 65 years of age or older.  The average household size was 2.55 and the average family size was 2.93.

In the township the population was spread out, with 25.6% under the age of 18, 5.1% from 18 to 24, 21.5% from 25 to 44, 29.5% from 45 to 64, and 18.3% who were 65 years of age or older.  The median age was 44 years. For every 100 females, there were 118.6 males.  For every 100 females age 18 and over, there were 113.4 males.

The median income for a household in the township was $40,000, and the median income for a family was $46,944. Males had a median income of $32,500 versus $21,538 for females. The per capita income for the township was $19,800.  About 4.4% of families and 9.5% of the population were below the poverty line, including 14.6% of those under age 18 and 6.5% of those age 65 or over.

References

Townships in Otter Tail County, Minnesota
Townships in Minnesota